The Norman Thompson N.T.2B was a British single-engined flying boat trainer of the First World War. A single-engined biplane, the N.T.2B was adopted as a standard flying boat trainer by the Royal Naval Air Service, training pilots for larger patrol flying boats such as the Felixstowe F.2.

Development and design
In late 1916, the Norman Thompson Flight Company, who had previously built 20 FBA Type B flying boat trainers, proposed to design and build a new trainer for pilots needed for large patrol flying boats such as the Curtiss Americas, Felixstowe F.2, and Norman Thompson's own N.T.4. The British Admiralty accepted the Norman Thompson proposal, and placed an order for 10 aircraft in November 1916 for the Royal Naval Air Service (RNAS).

The resulting aircraft, designated N.T.2B, was a single-engined pusher biplane, with unequal span two-bay wings and powered by a 160 hp (119 kW) Beardmore 160 hp engine mounted between the wings driving a four-bladed propeller. The trainee pilot and instructor sat side by side in an enclosed cockpit, fitted with dual controls.

While initial production was powered by the Beardmore, or by 150 hp (112 kW) Hispano-Suiza engines, later aircraft were fitted with a 200 hp (149 kW) Sunbeam Arab, which was mounted slightly to starboard of the centreline of the aircraft to overcome the greater torque of the more powerful engine.  The Arab, however, proved unreliable, and the powerplant was changed again, to the 200 hp (149 kW) Hispano-Suiza 8 engine, which was mounted at an angle to overcome a similar torque problem as was observed with the Arab.

The RNAS's (and after 1 April 1918, the Royal Air Force's) needs for the N.T.2B were beyond the capacity of Norman Thompson, so orders were placed with Supermarine and S. E. Saunders, as well as with the parent company.  At least 294 had been ordered by the end of the First World War, which brought about large scale cancellations.

Operational history
The first N.T.2B was delivered to the RNAS flying school at Calshot on 8 July 1917, the type becoming the standard training flying boat of the RNAS and RAF until the end of the First World War, although delivery delays caused by the engine problems caused a backlog in training flying boat pilots. Seventy-nine were on charge with the RAF on 31 October 1918. It operated at bases at Felixstowe and Lee-on-Solent as well as Calshot.

Following the end of the war, N.T.2Bs were sold to the air forces of Estonia, Peru and Norway. Civil N.T.2Bs were flown in Norway and Canada, where one aircraft remained in use for forestry patrols until 1929.

Operators

Royal Canadian Air Force

Estonian Air Force - 2 aircraft

Imperial Japanese Navy

Royal Norwegian Air Force

Peruvian Air Force - 2 Handley Page Ltd aircraft sent in 1919

Royal Naval Air Service
Royal Air Force

Specifications (N.T.2B - Arab engine)

See also

Notes
 The Norman Thompson Flight Company had gone into receivership in 1918, after delays in placing orders for new aircraft. Production continued at Norman Thompson's (and orders continued to be placed) despite this.  Norman Thompson Flight Company became part of Handley Page in 1919.
Estimates of the number of aircraft produced vary, with London giving production of 107–121, and Bruce estimating at least 150 built.

References

Sources

Andrews, C. F., and E. B. Morgan. Supermarine Aircraft since 1914. London:Putnam, 1987. .
Bruce, J. M. British Aeroplanes 1914-18. London:Putnam, 1957.
Donald, David (editor). The Encyclopedia of World Aircraft. Leicester, UK: Blitz Editions, 1997. .
 Gerdessen, Frederik. "Estonian Air Power 1918 – 1945". Air Enthusiast, No. 18, April – July 1982. pp. 61–76. .
Goodall, Michael H. The Norman Thompson File. Tunbridge Wells, UK: Air Britain (Historians) Ltd, 1995. .
Jackson, A. J. British Civil Aircraft 1919-1972: Volume III. London:Putnam, 1988. .
London, Peter. British Flying Boats. Stroud, UK: Sutton Publishing, 2003. .
London, Peter. "Island Pioneers; Aircraft Production Origins on the Isle of Wight". Air Enthusiast, No. 56, Winter 1994. pp. 71–77. .
London, Peter. "Bognor's Boats: The Aircraft of Norman Thompson". Air Enthusiast, No. 66, November–December 1996. pp. 70–75. .

External links
"Questions in Parliament". Flight, 29 May 1919, p. 716.
"Aviation in Parliament". Flight, 10 July 1919, pp. 925–926.
"Aviation in Parliament". Flight, 7 August 1919, pp. 1068–1069.

External links
Norman Thompson N.T.2. Image Bank – Canada Aviation Museum.

1910s British military trainer aircraft
Flying boats
Single-engined pusher aircraft
N.T.4
Biplanes
Aircraft first flown in 1917